The Battle at Lake Changjin is a 2021 Chinese war film co-directed and co-produced by Chen Kaige, Tsui Hark and Dante Lam, written by Lan Xiaolong and Huang Jianxin, and starring Wu Jing and Jackson Yee.  It was commissioned by the Central Propaganda Department of the Chinese Communist Party as part of the Party's 100th anniversary celebrations. The film depicts the story of the Chinese People's Volunteer Army forcing U.S. forces to withdraw in a fictionalized retelling of the Battle of the Chosin Reservoir during the Korean War.

The Battle at Lake Changjin is the most expensive film ever produced in China, with a budget of $200 million. The film grossed $913 million at the worldwide box office, making it the second-highest-grossing film of 2021, the highest-grossing Chinese film of all time, the highest-grossing non-English film, and the second highest-grossing film in a single market. A sequel to the film, The Battle at Lake Changjin II, was released on 1 February 2022.

The film's historical inaccuracies garnered controversy in some countries, including South Korea. The film has been described as propaganda.

Plot
Wu Qianli, commander of the People's Liberation Army's 7th Company, returns home after the Chinese Civil War. He tells his family that his brother, Wu Baili, was killed in action. Having been allotted land for his service, he promises his parents he will build them a house. However, the People's Republic of China enters the Korean War and his leave is canceled. Qianli's younger brother, Wanli, asks to go with him, but Qianli tells him not to.

The film jumps to 15 September 1950, where the Battle of Incheon is underway. Captions state that on 7 July 1950 General MacArthur "announced war on North Korea" and that "the U.S. air force carpet-bombed the total terrain of the enemy". The film makes no mention of the North Korean invasion of South Korea on 25 June 1950. U.S. aircraft are then shown indiscriminately bombing a village in Andong Province, China, north of the Yalu River.

The film then jumps to Beijing on 4 October 1950 where the Politburo of the Chinese Communist Party is meeting in Zhongnanhai to discuss the situation in North Korea. Mao Zedong asks whether the U.S. Army crossing the 38th parallel means they will also cross the Yalu (the China–North Korea border). The military briefer states that by stationing forces in Taiwan, the U.S. has already invaded China and that the buildup of U.S. forces in Korea threatens China's security. Early the next morning, Peng Dehuai visits Mao. Mao tells Peng that he doesn't want war, but that he will fight to protect the Chinese Communist Revolution. Mao's eldest son Mao Anying asks Peng if he can join the People's Volunteer Army forces being sent to Korea and Mao gives his blessing.

The 7th Company is instructed to deliver communications supplies to the front lines. To Qianli's horror, Wanli enlisted in the army despite his family's wishes. Wanli gets bullied by the other members of the 7th Company en route to Korea, with Qianli refusing to help him. When Qianli refuses to give him a gun, Wanli almost jumps out of the troop train in anger but is mesmerized by the sight of the Great Wall of China. After Wanli stands by the train door all night, Qianli decides to give him a rifle.

The troop train is bombed while the train track is being fixed, forcing the 7th Company to continue on foot. They have several close encounters with American aircraft along the way. While attempting to cross a dried-up lake, the 7th Company comes across patrolling American aircraft. The soldiers pretend to be dead but the American pilots decide to shoot the "stiffs" on a bet. Several members of the company are killed in the strafing, including Zhang Xiaoshan, a young soldier who had befriended Wanli.

The 7th Company stumble upon a battle in which they aid a group of Chinese soldiers and storm an American outpost, killing numerous American soldiers and destroying several tanks. Wanli and Qianli kill four American soldiers in hand-to-hand combat. An American tank tries to run over Wanli and Qianli, but the Chinese soldiers kill its crew and commandeer the tank. The battle ends in a tank duel, in which the Chinese infantrymen win. The 7th Company continues to the front lines, eventually arriving and delivering field radios.

The 7th Company is allowed to rest. Mao Anying, serving under the pseudonym "Liu", helps distribute clothing to them, but shortly after the company is ordered back to the front lines in anticipation of an offensive on American positions. The Chinese soldiers stay hidden in the mountains, running low on supplies and facing below-freezing temperatures. The film shows American soldiers celebrating Thanksgiving in relative comfort and anticipating going home for Christmas.

U.S. radio detection detects Peng Dehuai's headquarters and aircraft are sent to bomb the base. While most of the staff take shelter in bunkers, Mao Anying runs back to the base to collect a map and is killed in the bombing.

The offensive begins on the night of 27 November, with Chinese soldiers swarming the positions of the U.S. Army 31st Infantry Regiment at Sinhung-ni. One Chinese soldier kills three Americans in hand-to-hand combat, while several U.S. trucks and tanks are destroyed. The Americans begin to retreat; Qianli shoots the U.S. commander, Colonel Allan MacLean, wounding him, but then stops Wanli from executing him. At Hagaru-ri reinforcements are ordered to Sinhung-ni. A USMC Vought F4U Corsair attacks the Chinese forces and drops a smoke marker on the overrun base but is then shot down by a Chinese soldier using a bazooka. Lei Suisheng puts the smoke marker in a jeep and drives off, joining up with the retreating U.S. column. The U.S. bombers destroy the American column and Lei is killed.

The scene then cuts to Hagaru-ri which is under attack by the Chinese. U.S. forces are forced to retreat by air and land while they are pursued by Chinese forces. The scene then shifts again to the 3rd Company, 3rd Division, 58th Corps on Hill 1071, which is shown holding out against U.S. forces, having previously repelled seven attacks, fighting to the last man. Yang Gensi, as the last surviving member of his unit, suicidally attacks American tanks with a satchel charge.

The retreating U.S. Marine column finds a group of Chinese soldiers frozen to death at their post. General Oliver P. Smith salutes them; his voiceover is heard saying that fighting against such strong-willed men, the U.S. was not ordained to win.

The closing scenes show a U.S. mass grave at Hungnam as the city burns during the Hungnam evacuation. Captions state that 105,000 U.S. troops were evacuated by 24 December and that the 9th Corps captured Hungnam. The captions explain the significance of the battle of Lake Changjin, which was a "perfect example for annihilating a U.S. reinforced regiment", how it, together with operations in the west, stopped MacArthur's "presumptuous" plan to end the war by Christmas and forced the U.S. led "UN Command" back from the Yalu River and below the 38th Parallel and "set the stage for the final victory of the War to Resist U.S. Aggression and Aid Korea." The captions state that more than 197,000 Chinese died in the war. The film ends with the caption: "The great spirit of the War to Resist U.S. Aggression and Aid (North) Korea will eternally be renewed! Eternal glory to the great martyrs of the People's Volunteer Army!"

Cast
 Wu Jing as Wu Qianli, commander of the 7th Company.
 Jackson Yee as Wu Wanli, Artillery Platoon soldier of the 7th Company, younger brother of Wu Qianli.
 Kevin Lee as Colonel Allan MacLean, commanding officer 31st Infantry Regiment ("Polar Bears").
 John F. Cruz as Major General Oliver P. Smith, commanding general 1st Marine Division.
 C.T./Gao Mingyu Evans as Major General Edward Almond, commanding general X Corps.
 Duan Yihong as Tan Ziwei, commander of the 3rd Battalion.
 Zhu Yawen as Mei Sheng, political instructor of the 7th Company.
 Li Chen as Yu Congrong, leader of Fire Platoon of the 7th Company.
 Hu Jun as Lei Suisheng, leader of the Artillery (Mortar) Platoon of the 7th Company.
 Elvis Han as Ping He, a sniper in the 7th Company.
 Shi Pengyuan as Zhang Xiaoshan, a young soldier of the 7th Company who befriends Wanli; Xiaoshan's actor was 15 years old at the time of filming.
 Zhang Hanyu as Song Shilun, deputy commander of the People's Volunteer Army, commander and political commissar of the PVA 9th Army.
 Huang Xuan as Mao Anying, son of Mao Zedong, secretary for the People's Volunteer Army Headquarters.
 Oho Ou as Yang Gensi, commander of 3rd Company of 172nd Regiment of 58th Division of the 20th Corps.
 James Filbird as Douglas MacArthur, Commander in chief of the United Nations Command.
 Tang Guoqiang as Mao Zedong, chairman of the Chinese Communist Party, chairman of the Central People's Government Commission and chairman of the People's Revolutionary Military Commission of the Central People's Government.
 Zhou Xiaobin as Peng Dehuai, commander and political commissar of the People's Volunteer Army, vice chairman of the People's Revolutionary Military.
 Lin Yongjian as Deng Hua, first deputy commander and first deputy political commissar of the People's Volunteer Army.
 Wang Wufu as Zhu De, secretary of Secretariat of the Chinese Communist Party, vice chairman of the Central People's Government Commission and vice chairman of the People's Revolutionary Military Commission of the Central People's Government.
 Liu Sha as Liu Shaoqi, secretary of Secretariat of the Chinese Communist Party, vice chairman of the Central People's Government Commission and vice chairman of the People's Revolutionary Military Commission of the Central People's Government.
 Liu Jing as Zhou Enlai, secretary of Secretariat of the Chinese Communist Party, premier of the People's Republic of China, foreign minister and vice chairman of the People's Revolutionary Military Commission of the Central People's Government.
 Lu Qi as Deng Xiaoping, vice chairman of the Southwest Military Administrative Committee and political commissar of Southwest Military Region.

Production
The story of The Battle at Lake Changjin was commissioned by the National Radio and Television Administration, the Central Military Commission and the propaganda department of the Chinese Communist Party in Beijing, Hebei and Liaoning. The film was produced by Polybona Films. The screenplay was written by Lan Xiaolong, who previously wrote the novel Soldiers Sortie and its TV drama adaptation, and Huang Jianxin. In February 2020, it was reported that Andrew Lau had been offered the job of directing the film, but he was hired to direct Chinese Doctors instead; Chen Kaige, Tsui Hark and Dante Lam were later hired to direct the film. The Battle at Lake Changjin is one of the most expensive films ever made, with a production budget of over US$200 million.

Shooting began in Beijing on 25 October 2020, and ended on 25 May 2021. 70,000 People's Liberation Army soldiers acted as extras.

Part of the film was shot in Zhangjiakou, and part was shot on location in Zhejiang. The scene of the People's Volunteer Army boarding trucks to North Korea was filmed at Meishan railway station in Huzhou. Parts of the scenes were filmed in Lishimen Reservoir.

Music

Release
On 26 July 2021, the producers announced that the film was scheduled for release on 12 August 2021. On 5 August, the producers announced that the film was postponed due to the COVID-19 pandemic in China.

The film was selected to be the opening film of the 11th Beijing International Film Festival and premiered on 21 September 2021.

The Battle at Lake Changjin was released on 30 September 2021, in China. It was theatrically released in Hong Kong and Macau on 11 November. It was released in North America, the United Kingdom and Ireland on 19 November, and is scheduled to be released in Australia on 2 December.

Reception

Box office
The Battle at Lake Changjin has earned a total of CN¥5.77 billion ($913 million). It is the second-highest-grossing film of 2021 and the highest-grossing Chinese film of all time. The film earned a total of $82 million in its first two days of release, and reached 1.012 billion yuan ($155.12 million) on 2 October. By 3 October, it grossed 1.5 billion yuan ($233 million) at the Chinese box office. The film earned a total of 2 billion yuan ($310.3 million) in its first five days. On 6 October, the film grossed over 3 billion yuan ($465.46 million), becoming the 13th film with a box office of more than 3 billion yuan in China's film history.

By the end of its second weekend, it had earned $555.3 million. The film remained atop the Chinese box office for a month, being displaced by No Time to Die during the weekend of 29–31 October. It overtook Wolf Warrior 2 on 24 November to become the highest-grossing film in China. It also became the second highest-grossing film of all time in a single market, after Star Wars: The Force Awakens (2015) in the United States.

Critical and audience response
 Among Chinese ratings sites the movie has received a 9.5 on Maoyan and 7.6 on Douban.

The Global Times, a tabloid of the Chinese Communist Party, said that "the national feeling displayed in the film echoes the rising public sentiment in safeguarding national interests in front of provocations, which has great implications for today's China-US competition."

Film critic Todd McCarthy of Deadline Hollywood in reviewing, said that "Anyone into big-time action cinema on the largest possible screen will more than get their money's worth, even if the film is simplistic and entirely predictable in its goals, both as action and politics. But it doesn't matter how big your screen is at home—if you want to see this at all, see it on a really big screen." Conversely, Phil Hoad of The Guardian gave a two out of five rating, saying the film was a "sporadically thrilling, historically dubious account of a Korean war standoff, with all the subtlety of a rocket launcher."

Reviewing for Forbes, Scott Mendelson said "It’s arguably no more jingoistic, at least until the final montage, than (offhand) Pearl Harbor or We Were Soldiers." He further described the film as spectacular with its "copious mass battle sequences and intricate action set pieces" against what was a "pretty dry war picture" and a "generic war actioner" when compared with The Eight Hundred.

Reviewing in The Independent, Louis Chilton wrote that, while it was fair to describe the film as propaganda, the same criticism should be directed at similar American films such as American Sniper or Captain Marvel.

Controversies and inaccuracies
The movie has been described as propaganda. Sophia Yan of The Daily Telegraph wrote that it is an "anti-US propaganda film" that tapped into a "growing nationalist sentiment", while the BBC described the film as "Chinese propaganda". Stanley Rosen, a political science professor from the University of Southern California, stated that the release and popularity of the film "is definitely related to the ongoing tensions with the US, and has been promoted that way—sometimes indirectly, but still very clearly". Sun Hongyun, an associate professor at Beijing Film Academy said that the film was "an extraordinary and perfect collusion of capital and political propaganda".

CNN noted that the film was commissioned by the propaganda department of the Chinese Communist Party, while Business Insider and The Economist said that the movie was part of a "main melody" genre of entertainment that praises China, the Chinese Communist Party, and the People's Liberation Army.

An article in The New York Times described the film as a government-sponsored movie that appeared to resonate with the Chinese public at a time of tension in the US-China relationship despite "mixed reviews, a torturous running time and technical errors of military history, tapping into nationalistic sentiment that China's leader, Xi Jinping, has nurtured" and underscored the extent to which the Chinese Communist Party was determined to shape popular culture.

Rebecca Davis of Foreign Policy described the film's sequel and companion piece, The Battle at Lake Changjin II, as propaganda that "extol the virtues of sacrificing oneself for the Chinese Communist Party." She further described the film as "plodding, heavy-handed, and preachy", and that although the film "portrays U.S. Gen. Douglas MacArthur as a nuclear-war-hungry boor and spends most of its two-and-a-half-hour run time slaughtering Americans", its subject is "is the suffering of Chinese troops, not pure anti-Americanism."

Park Min-hee of The Hankyoreh stated that the film is a part of "political propaganda suggesting that China will fight and ultimately defeat the US" in a new Cold War that began in 2018, she also wrote that "such patriotic propaganda is also intended to control the grievances caused by rising unemployment and inequality". She further criticized China's interpretation Korean War, as "by only considering the outcome of the battle for the two superpowers of the US and China, it fails to consider Koreans’ position, not to mention their sacrifice. Xi's declaration that China fought a just war in which it resolutely defeated the “intruder” disregards the historical fact that the war was started when North Korea invaded with support from China and the Soviet Union."

US Marine Lieutenant General Richard E. Carey, a veteran of the Battle of Chosin Reservoir, criticized the film as propaganda and a distorted depiction of the battle. Carey said that at Chosin Reservoir, despite being overwhelmingly outnumbered, American forces badly defeated, demoralized and so wounded the Chinese forces, that a legion's worth of men had to withdraw to China to completely regroup and reequip. He described the Battle of Chosin Reservoir as a Chinese defeat. Carey also stated that up to 100,000 Korean refugees were evacuated together with UN troops at Hungnam. In addition, Kim Young-kweon of Voice of America noted that during the battle, US and UN forces suffered significantly less casualties than the Chinese.

After the release of the movie, former Chinese journalist Luo Changping was arrested by police and held on the charge of "infringing the reputation and honour of national martyrs" after multiple police reports were filed over his online post in Sina Weibo, where he posted commentary questioning China's role in the Korean War, drawing criticism from thousands of social media users.

The film has been banned in Malaysia, a country where the dissemination of communist ideology is illegal.

Deutsche Welle reported that the film has raised anger in South Korea, with the public calling it "propaganda filled with historical inaccuracies." South Korean former diplomat Ra Jong-yil called the film "nonsense" and "whitewashing" and accused it of attempting to reshape the narrative of events during the Korean War. The reaction raised the possibility that the film would not be distributed in South Korea.

Awards and nominations

Sequel

A sequel entitled The Battle at Lake Changjin II was released on 1 February 2022, the first day of Chinese New Year. (Chinese: 长津湖之水门桥; Pinyin: zhǎng jīn hú zhī shuǐ mén qiáo; literal meaning: Water Gate Bridge of Lake Changjin). The movie is about a maneuver undertaken by the PVA in the same campaign to destroy a bridge that was used by the US forces as part of their withdrawal.

See also
 List of highest-grossing films in China
 Highest-grossing films of 2021 
 Highest-grossing non-English films

References

External links
 
 

2021 films
2021 controversies
2020s Mandarin-language films
Chinese epic films
Chinese war films
Chinese propaganda films
Film controversies
Film controversies in China
Film censorship in Malaysia
Film controversies in Malaysia
Films shot in Beijing
Films set in Beijing
IMAX films
Korean War films
2020s war films
Films directed by Chen Kaige
Films directed by Tsui Hark
Films directed by Dante Lam
Polybona Films films
Films postponed due to the COVID-19 pandemic
Films shot in Zhangjiakou
Films set in South Hamgyong Province